Dimitrios Goutas (born 4 April 1994) is a Greek professional footballer who plays as a centre-back for Turkish Süper Lig club Sivasspor and the Greece national team.

Club career
After graduating with Skoda Xanthi, Goutas was promoted to first team in the summer of 2012. On 28 October 2012, he made his first team debut, in a 0–0 away draw against Veria. On 9 December, he scored his first professional goal, in a 4–0 home win Panionios. On 13 March 2013, Goutas scored his second goal, in a 2–0 away win against Panthrakikos.

On the 17th of July 2015, Goutas signed for Olympiacos, while his former team was compensated with €800,000 and a 30% of his next transfer's value. On 23 December 2015, Goutas returns to his former club, Xanthi on loan from Olympiacos until the end of season. Olympiacos bought Goutas this summer but the player failed to make a single appearance with the red jersey.

On August 22, 2016, Goutas became Kortrijk's third signing from Greece when he joined the Belgian club on a twelve-month loan deal from Olympiacos. On 17 September 2016, he made his debut with the club as a starter in a 2–1 away loss against Zulte Waregem. On August 8, 2017, Goutas became Sint-Truiden's third signing from Greece in this summer, when he joined the Belgian club on a twelve-month loan deal from Olympiacos, playing for second consecutive year in Belgian First Division A. On 26 October 2017, he scored his first goal with the club and in Belgian championship, sealing a victory against Royal Excel Mouscron.

On 28 August 2018, the 24-year-old central defender who is not included, in Olympiacos coach Pedro Martins' plans will pass a medical exam on Wednesday morning and if everything goes well he will sign the third Polish last season Lech Poznan, which will then formally announce him. As the country's media broadcast, the player is given by the Piraeus players in the form of borrowing for one year and a purchase option for the next summer. His loan finishes with the end of 2018–19 season.

On 24 June 2019, Goutas solved his contract with Olympiacos. Two days later he signed with Peristeri club Atromitos on a two years' contract for an undisclosed fee. His first goal came in a 2–2 away draw against Lamia, on 1 September 2019.

On 27 September 2020, he scored with a header in stoppage time, to give his team an important 2–2 away draw against OFI.

On 8 June 2021, Atromitos announced his departure from the club.

On 16 July 2021, Goutas will continue his career at Sivasspor, signing a two years' contract with an undisclosed fee. The Greek defender who left Atromitos, was waiting for a proposal from abroad, despite the interest of Asteras Tripoli. Earlier, however, the Greek centre-back was closed to sign with another Turkish club, Göztepe S.K., but Sivaspor finally managed to get his positive response. He made an impressive debut in Süper Lig with the club on 29 August, as he scored a brace, to help his team seal a 2–2 home draw over Göztepe S.K. He was voted man of the match for his performance. On 5 February 2022, he scored the only goal in a devastating 5–1 away loss again Gaziantep F.K.

International career
Goutas made his debut with Greece national football team in a World Cup qualification home match against Spain on 11 November 2021, in which Greece lost 1–0.

Career statistics

Club

Honours
Sivasspor
 Turkish Cup: 2021–22

References

External links

1994 births
Living people
Footballers from Kavala
Greek footballers
Greece youth international footballers
Greece under-21 international footballers
Greece international footballers
Greek expatriate footballers
Xanthi F.C. players
Olympiacos F.C. players
K.V. Kortrijk players
Sint-Truidense V.V. players
Lech Poznań players
Atromitos F.C. players
Sivasspor footballers
Super League Greece players
Belgian Pro League players
Ekstraklasa players
Süper Lig players
Expatriate footballers in Belgium
Expatriate footballers in Poland
Expatriate footballers in Turkey
Association football central defenders